Walter Ulfig was a German composer of film scores.

Selected filmography
 Das Meer (1927)
 Venus im Frack (1927)
 Svengali (1927)
 Bigamie (1927)
 Homesick (1927)
 The Awakening of Woman (1927)
 The Famous Woman (1927)
 Alpine Tragedy (1927)
 The Strange Case of Captain Ramper (1927)
 Assassination (1927)
 Queen Louise (1927)
 Homesick (1927)
 Das Schicksal einer Nacht (1927)
 The Hunt for the Bride (1927)
 The Orlov (1927)
 Serenissimus and the Last Virgin (1928)
 Mariett Dances Today (1928))
 The Woman from Till 12 (1928)
 The Beloved of His Highness (1928)
 The Schorrsiegel Affair (1928)
 It Attracted Three Fellows (1928)
 Miss Chauffeur (1928)
 The King of Carnival (1928)
 The Weekend Bride (1928)
 Honeymoon (1928)
 Spring Awakening (1929)
 The Right of the Unborn (1929)
 The Heath Is Green (1932)
 Höllentempo (1933)
 The Two Seals (1934)
 Pappi (1934)
 Mädchenräuber (1936)

Bibliography
 Jung, Uli & Schatzberg, Walter. Beyond Caligari: The Films of Robert Wiene. Berghahn Books, 1999.

External links

Year of birth unknown
Year of death unknown
German film score composers
Male film score composers
German male composers